King Jama kaNdaba (c. 1727–1781), the son of Ndaba kaMageba, was king of the Zulu Kingdom from 1763 to 1781. It is alleged he prophesied the birth of King Shaka. His grandfather was King Mageba kaGumede.

Biography 
His name is derived from the Zulu word meaning "he of the stern countenance".

Marriage 
He married, amongst others, Mthaniya Sibiya, who bore him Senzangakhona, who succeeded him. Senzangakhona was the father of the three Zulu kings, including the greatest, Shaka. He also had a daughter named Mkabayi kaJama.

His daughter Mkabayi 
Mkabayi singlehandedly courted Mthaniya for her father Jama who was aging without having a successor. She did this without her father’s knowledge and when he found out he said: "Nenzengakhona", which means "you have done accordingly." Mthaniya’s first son was named Senzangakhona – "we have done accordingly", after his sister’s efforts to find her father a successor. Mkabayi was a twin and Zulu custom dictated that one of the twins be sacrificed to evade bad luck that would result in the death of one of the parents.

Jama refused to kill one of his girls and broke a known tradition. Consequently his wife died without bearing him a successor. Mkabayi devoted her whole life in looking after the Zulu Kingdom due to the sacrifice her parents made for her to live.

Sources 

1757 births
1781 deaths
Zulu kings
18th-century monarchs in Africa

fr:Chefs des Zoulous avant 1816#Jama kaNdaba (vers 1757-1781)